The Buildings at 2517, 2519, and 2523 Central Street are three related apartment buildings at 2517, 2519, and 2523 Central Street in Evanston, Illinois. The three two-flats were built as part of one development project in 1927. Architect Arthur Jacobs designed all three buildings using a consistent theme, so that the three buildings would have different designs but appear as parts of a complex. Common features to each building include a light-colored brick exterior, a projecting front facade, stone trim, and green tile roofs. All three buildings have a vertical emphasis, which is created by either buttresses or piers. Each building has an ornate roof line; 2517 has a parapet crested by pinnacles, 2519 has brick piers capped by urns which extend above the roof, and 2523 has a parapet with limestone coping and pinnacles.

The buildings were added individually to the National Register of Historic Places on March 15, 1984.

References

Buildings and structures on the National Register of Historic Places in Cook County, Illinois
Residential buildings on the National Register of Historic Places in Illinois
Buildings and structures in Evanston, Illinois
Apartment buildings in Illinois
Residential buildings completed in 1927